The Church of St Mary Magdalene is a church in Essendine, Rutland. It is a Grade II* listed building.

History

The small church is built within the remains of the castle, which appears to have been an early Norman bailey, later developing into a strongly fortified manor.

The church is made up of a chancel and a nave dating to the 12th and 13th centuries. The church has no tower but does have a double bell-cote.

The church has a notable Norman tympanum over its south door. The tympanum has a carving of  Christ in Majesty with angels. The door of the church probably dates back to the 12th century but some suggest it is Anglo-Saxon.

References

Essendine
Essendine